Lo Sin Lam (born 18 December 1992), known as Sonia Lo, is a Hong Kong windsurfer.

She qualified for the 2016 Summer Olympics in Rio de Janeiro, and was selected to represent Hong Kong in the women's RS:X event.

References

External links
 
 
 

1992 births
Living people
Hong Kong female sailors (sport)
Hong Kong windsurfers
Hong Kong sportswomen
Olympic sailors of Hong Kong
Sailors at the 2016 Summer Olympics – RS:X
Asian Games medalists in sailing
Asian Games silver medalists for Hong Kong
Sailors at the 2014 Asian Games
Medalists at the 2014 Asian Games
Female windsurfers